Lane Roberts (born April 6, 1948) is an American politician. He is a member of the Missouri House of Representatives from the 161st District, serving since 2019. He is a member of the Republican Party. Prior to seeking elected office, Roberts served as Director of the Missouri Department of Public Safety, and as Chief of the Joplin Police Department.

References

Living people
1940s births
Republican Party members of the Missouri House of Representatives
Politicians from Joplin, Missouri
American police chiefs
State cabinet secretaries of Missouri
21st-century American politicians
People from Oceanside, California